J. B. Lippincott & Co. was an American publishing house founded in Philadelphia, Pennsylvania in 1836 by Joshua Ballinger Lippincott. It was incorporated in 1885 as J. B. Lippincott Company.

History

1836–1977

Joshua Ballinger Lippincott (March 18, 1813 – January 5, 1886) founded the publishing company in Philadelphia when he was 23 years old. J. B. Lippincott & Co. began business publishing Bibles and prayer books before expanding into history, biography, fiction, poetry, and gift books. The company later added almanacs, medicine and law, school textbooks, and dictionaries. In 1849, Lippincott acquired Grigg, Elliot & Co., a significant publisher and wholesaler whose origins dated back to printer and bookseller Benjamin and Jacob Johnson in 1792. In 1850 J. B. Lippincott & Co. became Lippincott, Grambo & Co. but reverted to its former name in 1855. The company was incorporated in 1878 as J. B. Lippincott Company.  Lippincott published the first textbook of nursing in the US in 1878 and the first issue of the American Journal of Nursing in 1900. By the end of the 19th century, Lippincott was one of the largest and best-known publishers in the world. Lippincott's Monthly Magazine, a popular periodical containing a complete novel, short stories, poetry, and opinion, was published in the US and the UK from 1868 to 1914. During the 20th century Lippincott also became a major publisher of schoolbooks for elementary and high school education and of references, textbooks, and journals in medicine and nursing. In 1961, Lippincott acquired the religious publisher A. J. Holman.

1978–1995
In 1978, J. B. Lippincott Company was acquired by Harper & Row Publishers, Inc. A. J. Holman was sold to the Sunday School Board of the Southern Baptist Convention in 1979. Lippincott's trade, juvenile and elementary and high school divisions were merged into Harper's. The remaining publishing activities, in medicine, nursing, and allied health, were combined with Harper's programs to form "J.B. Lippincott - the Health Professions Publisher of Harper & Row". In 1990, Lippincott was acquired by Wolters Kluwer N.V. of The Netherlands. J. B. Lippincott Company celebrated its 200th anniversary in 1992.

1996–present
Wolters Kluwer merged Lippincott with its other medical publisher, Raven Press, in 1996 to form Lippincott-Raven Publishers. In 1998 Wolters Kluwer acquired medical publisher Williams & Wilkins and combined it with Lippincott-Raven to form Lippincott Williams & Wilkins. After further internal reorganization at Wolters Kluwer in 2002, Lippincott Williams & Wilkins ceased to exist as an operational entity; instead, the names Lippincott Williams & Wilkins and Lippincott are now used solely as publishing imprints of Wolters Kluwer Health.

Leadership

Presidents of J. B. Lippincott Company
Joshua Ballinger Lippincott (1885–1886)
Craige Lippincott (1886–1911)
J. Bertram Lippincott (1911–1926), (Chairman, 1926–1940)
Joseph Wharton Lippincott (1926–1949), (Chairman, 1949–1958)
Howard K. Bauernfeind (1949–1958), (Chairman, 1958–1973)
Joseph W. Lippincott, Jr. (1958–1978), (Chairman 1974–1978)
Barton H. Lippincott (1978–1981), (Chairman, 1981–1987)
Edward B. Hutton, Jr. (1981–1983)
Lewis Reines (1985–1986)

Peter D. Nalle (1987–1990)
Alan M. Edelson (1990–1994)
Mary Martin Rogers (1995–1996)

Co-Presidents of Lippincott-Raven Publishers
Mary Martin Rogers and Joseph W. Lippincott III (1996–1998)

Co-Presidents of Lippincott Williams & Wilkins
Edward B. Hutton, Jr. and Joseph W. Lippincott III (1998–2000)
Jeffrey Smith and Tim Satterfield (2000–2002)

Notable authors 
  
 Edward Abbey
 Henry Adams
 James Baldwin
 Hall Caine
 Harper Lee
 Vincent T. DeVita
 Arthur Conan Doyle
 Mary Henderson Eastman
 Leon Edel

 Nikki Giovanni
 Gwethalyn Graham
 Grace Livingston Hill
 Zora Neale Hurston
 Henry James
 Rudyard Kipling
 L.L. Langstroth

 Jack London
 Stanley Loomis
 Betty MacDonald
 John D. MacDonald
 L.M. Montgomery
 Christopher Morley
 Alfred Noyes

 Mary O'Hara
 Thomas Pynchon
 Piers Paul Read
 Steven Rosenberg
 Amélie Rives Troubetzkoy
 Dalton Trumbo
 Oscar Wilde
 Forrest Wilson
Sir Samuel White Baker

See also

History of books

References

External links

Brief history of J. B. Lippincott Company at Lippincott Williams & Wilkins
"Joseph Wharton Lippincott, Jr." , Princeton University memorial
J. B. Lippincott Company Records,  Historical Society of Pennsylvania

Book publishing companies based in Pennsylvania
American companies established in 1836
American companies disestablished in 1990
1836 establishments in Pennsylvania
Defunct book publishing companies of the United States
Companies based in Philadelphia
Publishing companies established in 1836